Seikkan Township was a township located in the western part of Yangon, Myanmar. One of the smallest townships, Seikkan consisted of just three wards. It had a primary school and a hospital.

Seikkan township was split and merged into Botataung Township and Lanmadaw Township in February 2020.

References

Townships of Yangon